Tacolneston Hall, in the village of Tacolneston in the county of Norfolk, has been the home of the Boileau baronets since the baronetcy was created in 1838.

References

 
 

Country houses in Norfolk
Grade II* listed buildings in Norfolk